Below is a list of notable people born in Prilep, North Macedonia or its surroundings:
 
 Ipče Ahmedovski, singer
 Gregory Akindynos, theologian
 Ezgjan Alioski, football player
 Metodija Andonov-Čento, first president of ASNOM and of the Socialist Republic of Macedonia
 George Atanasoski, politician and founder of several companies
 Atanas Badev, composer
 Dobrila Grasheska, singer
 Marko Cepenkov, folklorist
 Haris Hajradinović, football player
 Blaže Koneski, poet, writer, literary translator, linguistic scholar (codification of standard Macedonian)
 Prince Marko, Macedonian king
 Ilčo Naumoski, football player
 Petar Naumoski, former basketball player and current politician
 Mile Nedelkoski, writer
 Jane Nikolovski, football goalkeeper
 Dositej Novaković, Orthodox bishop
 Ali Fethi Okyar, Turkish diplomat and politician
 Elena Petreska, pop singer
 Gjorče Petrov, leader of the Internal Macedonian-Adrianople Revolutionary Organization (IMARO)
 Petar Popović, Serbian architect 
 Toše Proeski, Macedonian music megastar
 Goce Sedloski, football player, defender
 Gligor Sokolović, Chetnik vojvoda 
 Mihail Solunov, journalist and monk
 Vlatko Stefanovski, ethno-rock jazz fusion guitar player
 Dimitar Talev, writer
 Elena Velevska, turbo folk and popular music singer

Prilep
List